The Mushoku Tensei series features a vast world with an extensive cast of characters. The series is about a jobless and hopeless man who reincarnates into a fantasy world while keeping his memories, being determined to live his new life without any regrets.

Main characters

Before his reincarnation, he was an overweight 34-year-old Japanese NEET who became a recluse following his high school persecution. After his reincarnation, he discards his past identity, and works hard to make his new life as Rudeus Greyrat meaningful. As such, he adopts a gentleman persona, though his past life's perversion sometimes emerges and scares those around him. Since he retains his intelligence, Rudeus was able to start magic training at age 3, and learn how to cast magic without chanting. Due to this training, he has an abnormally large mana capacity. Because his then magic teacher, Roxy Migurdia, helped him to overcome his fear of the outside world, he worships her like a god and ties his accomplishments to her. During his spare time, Rudeus makes figurines to enhance his earth magic, which has become his main offensive magic.

A demon from the Migurdia species known for their telepathy, blue hair, youthful appearance, and longevity. Because she can't use telepathy unlike the others in her village who mostly rely only on telepathy to talk, so she leaves her village due to feeling isolated from not being able to converse with her peers. Unable to make a stable living as an adventurer, she becomes a traveling tutor and eventually becomes Rudeus' teacher. After the teleportation incident, Roxy helps Paul search the world for survivors.

Usually called "Sylphy", is Rudeus' childhood friend who is part human, elf, and beast race. Bullied as a child, she was helped by Rudeus. Rudeus then teaches her magic when she asked him to after she witnessed him helping her with his magic. Rudeus' influence helped her learn how to cast magic without chanting.
 

A noble girl and distant relative of Rudeus. She is a tsundere with a short temper but has potential in the Sword-God style. During her journey with Rudeus to return home following the teleportation incident, she grows to love Rudeus but gets worried after seeing how Rudeus was defeated by the Orsted and nearly died as a result as she was not strong enough to protect Rudeus with her sword skills. She then leaves Rudeus on a journey to further enhance her sword fighting power.

Greyrat Family

Rudeus' father. He discarded his noble lineage due to its restrictive lifestyles and became a proficient swordsman skilled in all three sword styles: Sword-God, Water-God, and North-God style. He is described as a playboy and an adventurer with sharp intuition. Following the teleportation incident and unable to find his family, Paul falls into a depression and drowns his sorrows in alcohol until his reunion with Rudeus.

Paul's first wife and Rudeus' mother. Paul saves her from people attempting to take advantage of her and she falls in love with him. When Lilia becomes pregnant with Paul's child, Rudeus convinces her to forgive them. 

Originally Paul's classmate in a swordsman dojo. A crippling injury forces her to leave her position as a princess guard. She becomes a maid to Paul and Zenith. She later has an affair with Paul and becomes pregnant. After working through the revelation with the family, she is taken in as Paul's second wife and becomes closer friends with Zenith. Rudeus' behavior as an infant scared her, though she swears her loyalty to him after he helps her to reconcile with Zenith.

Zenith's daughter and Rudeus' younger sister. She was with Paul after the teleportation incident and loved him dearly. When Rudeus fights Paul, she becomes fearful of him. 

Lilia's daughter and Rudeus' younger half-sister. From her mother's teachings, Aisha takes it upon herself to manage Rudeus' housework. She is exceptionally talented and intelligent but dedicates herself to housework instead of furthering her skills.

Rudeus and Sylphiette's daughter.

Ronoa Magic University
 

A human "", a person born with unique abilities. His ability grants him superhuman strength and endurance. Since his youth, he had a fondness for dolls.
 

An elf. She was Paul's former comrade and was part of Roxy's search party to help her look for Rudeus after his disappearance.

He is a Special Student in the Ranoa academy due to his talents.
 and  
The candidates to become the leader of their village. They are from the beast race with cat and dog characteristics, respectively. 

One of the Special Students. A genius in her own right, she never shows up to class due to her research.

A princess of the Asura kingdom who competes with her brother to the right to succeed the throne. Ariel is wise charismatic but vents her stress out through sadistic acts. She and her bodyguards develop a strong friendship during their time together. Ariel intends to become the queen to honor the people who died for her.

Antagonists

An unidentified being who calls himself a "human god". He appears in the dreams of the mortals, gives them omens, and manipulates the world according to his own convenience.

The instigator of the human demon war.

Other characters

A kind man from the demon race known as supards. They were manipulated and cursed by Laplace during the war between humans and demons. They developed a stigma of being murderous monsters. Under manipulation, Ruijerd killed his son, who could free him from Laplace's control. Following his species' death, Ruijerd travels the world to dissolve the stigma against the supard race. 

A powerful swords-woman from a beast race and a member of the Dedoldia tribe, she has the epithet of "Sword King" and is a former member of Paul and Zenith's old party. She is also the aunt of Riria Dedoldia. Ghislaine is employed as the Eris' family bodyguard; however, because she never learned to read and write, she was susceptible to scams until Rudeus taught her literacy and magic, including spells to enhance her abilities.

The demon empress knew for her demon eyes powers and the ability to bestow others with demon eyes. Badigadi has an older sister named , a skilled swordsman who likes to conscript people into her demon army through the use of a magic contract.

A member of the dragon tribe, humanoids with powerful abilities. He is considered the strongest of his kind, giving him the title of the hundredth Dragon God. Orsted have constitution that make everyone that meet him, feeling fear except fews individuals. He also present at Rudeus deathbed, musing that Rudeus offspring is the only lineage that didn't fear him as bad as others.

One of the warriors who defeated Laplace during the war between humans and demons. He resides in a floating castle and has eleven familiar spirit with an angelic humanoid named  serving him. He awaits the day Laplace is reincarnated to kill him again.

Reception
Early response to the Mushoku Tensei characters was primarily negative due to Rudeus' perverted nature to the point the original writer noted that such was the point of his characterization. However, his relationship with his mentor and his father Paul were praised for bringing the narrative hidden depths. Roxy became a break out character in her own series which was praised by Otaku USA for being accessible but hoped to further develop her in future volumes. Comic Book Resources said that Mushoku Tensei is enjoyable thanks to the large amount of characters. TwinInfinite listed Roxy as one of the best teachers in anime. In a manga review from the early arcs, Akiba Station noted that while Rudeus gets into less fights, he is contrasted by the parallel adventures of Roxy. 

Roxy' figurine that Rudeus creates in the series was popular enough to get its own replica in real life. One of the web novel short after-stories, titled The Moment Aisha Greyrat Stopped Being a Maid, sparked a lot of controversy among its Japanese readers. In response, the author had initially planned to make some revisions, but figured it would not be good enough, and after receiving a notice from Shōsetsuka ni Narō management that it violated their terms of service, on February 24, 2016, the author announced that he had decided to scrap the short story altogether and would write a remake in the future.

Notes
Japanese

References

External links
  at Shōsetsuka ni Narō 
 Official light novel website 
 Official manga website 
 Official anime website 
 

Mushoku Tensei